Woodlands is a historic home and farm complex located near Charlottesville, Albemarle County, Virginia.  The main block was built in 1842–1843, and is a brick I-house with Federal detailing.  It was expanded in the 1890s by a two-story frame-and-brick rear "T" with one- and two-story wraparound verandahs.  Also on the property is a tall, narrow frame barn, dated to the 1840s, and later farm buildings erected in the 1910s and '20s including a frame dairy barn, a glazed-tile silo, and a stone-and-frame horse barn.

It was added to the National Register of Historic Places in 1989.

References

Houses on the National Register of Historic Places in Virginia
Federal architecture in Virginia
Houses completed in 1843
National Register of Historic Places in Albemarle County, Virginia
1843 establishments in Virginia
Houses in Albemarle County, Virginia